Tiit-Rein Viitso (4 March 1938 – 2 December 2022) was an Estonian linguist.

In 1962, he graduated from Tartu State University in Estonian philology. In the years 1965–1973 he worked at Tartu State University's Computational Centre. During 1973–1993 he worked at Estonian Language Institute, and from 1986 – at Tartu State University (now, the University of Tartu).

His main fields of research have been Finnic languages, especially Estonian, Livonian, Votic and Veps languages. From 2007 he was the chief editor of the journal Linguistica Uralica. In 1989, and again, from 1993 until 1997, he was the director of the Mother Tongue Society (Emakeele Selts).

Viitso died on 2 December 2022, at the age of 84.

Awards
 2001: Order of the White Star, V class.
 2011: Wiedemann Language Award

Works

 Äänisvepsa murde väljendustasandi kirjeldus (1968)
 Läänemeresoome keelte fonoloogia küsimusi (1981)
 Erzya prosody (2003, one of the authors)
 Meadow Mari prosody (2005, one of the authors)
 Liivi keel ja läänemeresoome keelemaastikud (2008) 
 Livonian prosody (2008, one of the authors)

References

1938 births
2022 deaths
20th-century linguists
21st-century linguists
Linguists from Estonia
Estonian Finno-Ugrists
Estonian scholars
Recipients of the Order of the White Star, 5th Class
University of Tartu alumni
Academic staff of the University of Tartu
People from Tallinn